The 19051 / 19052 Valsad–Muzaffarpur Shramik Express is an Express train running between Valsad of Gujarat and Muzaffarpur of Bihar.

It operates as train number 19051 from Valsad to Muzaffarpur Junction and as train number 19052 in the reverse direction, serving the states of Gujarat, Maharashtra, Madhya Pradesh, Uttar Pradesh and Bihar.

Coach composition

The train consists of 23 coaches:

 1 AC II cum AC III tier(AB1)
 1 AC III tier(B1)
 14 Sleeper class(SL)
 5 General Unreserved(GEN)
 2 Seating cum Luggage Rake(SLR)

Services

19051 Valsad–Muzaffarpur Shramik Express covers the distance of 1782 km in 32 hours 35 mins (57 km/h) & in 35 hours as 19052 Muzaffarpur–Valsad Shramik Express (53 km/h).

As the average speed of the train is below , as per Indian Railway rules, its fare does not includes a Superfast surcharge.

Route & Halts

The important halts of the train are:

Traction

The 19051 / 19052 Shramik Express is hauled by a Vadodara based WAP-7 locomotive from Valsad to Muzaffarpur and vice versa.

Schedule

Reversals

Rake sharing

The train shares its rake with 12943/12944 Udyog Karmi Express.

See also
 Tapti Ganga Express
 Udhna–Varanasi Express
 Surat–Muzaffarpur Express
 Surat–Bhagalpur Express

References

Transport in Valsad
Transport in Muzaffarpur
Named passenger trains of India
Rail transport in Bihar
Rail transport in Gujarat
Rail transport in Madhya Pradesh
Rail transport in Uttar Pradesh
Express trains in India